The Dan Patch Trainer of the Year Award is an annual award created in 1985 by members of the United States Harness Writers Association (USHWA). The Association's website states that their members' determination is aided by input from the American Harness Racing Secretaries plus logistic expertise provided by the United States Trotting Association. 

The award winner receives the Glen Garnsey Trophy, named in honor of the Hall of Fame trainer who died at the zenith of his career at age 52 in 1985 as the result of an automobile accident.

There are several categories of USHWA Dan Patch Award named for the legendary pacer Dan Patch (1896-1916).

Past winners:
2022 Jim Campbell
2021 Richard "Nifty" Norman
2020 Nancy Takter
2019 Marcus Melander
2018 Ron Burke
2017 Brian Brown
2016 Jimmy Takter
2015 : Jimmy Takter 
2014 : Jimmy Takter 
2013 : Ronald J. Burke 
2012 : Linda Toscano 
2011 : Ronald J. Burke
2010 : Jimmy Takter
2009 : Gregory B. Peck
2008 : Ray Schnittker
2007 : Steve Elliott
2006 : Mickey Burke
2005 : Ervin M. Miller
2004 : Trond Smedshammer
2003 : Ivan Sugg
2002 : Jim Doherty
2001 : Robert McIntosh

2000 : Mark Ford / Jimmy Takter
1999 : Ron Gurfein
1998 : Brett Pelling
1997 : William Wellwood
1996 : Jimmy Takter
1995 : Joe Holloway
1994 : Carl Allen
1993 : William G. Robinson
1992 : Robert McIntosh
1991 : Per Eriksson
1990 : Gene Riegle / Bruce Nickells
1989 : Richard Stillings / Harry J. Poulton
1988 : Steve Elliott
1987 : Charles "Chuck" Sylvester
1986 : Soren Nordin
1985 : Charles "Chuck" Sylvester

See also
Eclipse Award for Outstanding Trainer

References

American horse racing awards
American Champion harness racing trainers
Harness racing in the United States
Horse racing awards